Leonardo García Vale (born December 27, 1972, in Mexico City, Distrito Federal) is a Mexican actor.

Filmography

Films

Television

External links
 Leonardo Garcia Biography (Bilingual)
 

1972 births
Living people
Mexican male film actors
Mexican male telenovela actors
Mexican people of American descent
Mexican people of Dominican Republic descent
Mexican people of Spanish descent
Male actors from Mexico City